is an anime adaptation of 5pb.'s video game of the same name. The series was directed by Masato Jinbo at Silver Link, and aired in Japan from January to March 2017; it was followed by the theatrical film Chaos;Child: Silent Sky in June 2017, which adapts the game's ending.

Episode list

Film

Notes

References

Lists of anime episodes
Science Adventure